Axel Petersson Döderhultarn, formerly Axel Petersson, (12 December 1868 – 15 March 1925) was a Swedish wood carver who was one of the recognized masters of wood carving, most famous for Scandinavian flat-plane-style woodcarving.

Early years 
Axel Petersson Döderhultarn was born in the parish of Döderhult in Oskarshamn Municipality. His parents were Eva Lotta Persdotter and Per August Petersson. When he was five years of age, his father died. Members of his family decided the best thing for him to do as a young adult was to emigrate to the United States. Petersson did not emigrate to America, as his family had planned, and after a brief time away he moved back to help his widowed mother in Oskarshamn.

In his youth, his primary interest was in whittling, and carving small figures. He worked on figure carving and sold figurines in the local market in Oskarshamn. Most of the figures he sold were refined traditional wood carvings. Sometime around 1900 he began to carve in a minimalist style. These are the carved figures he is most famous for. Many of these carvings sold in the local market for $1.00 – $2.00 USD. Adjusted for inflation, $1.50 in 1900 would be equivalent to $33.23 in 2005.

Recognition
In 1909, Petersson was invited to participate in an exhibition in Stockholm. The public response to his work was overwhelming.  Georg Nordensvan wrote in the newspaper Dagens Nyheter on 20 January 1909, "Axel Petersson's old men are irresistibly amusing. The depict such primitive art as one could wish for, made out of a couple of simple contours using only a couple of strokes, but, from an artist with sure eye and nimble hands. It is a new conception with a personal touch...small masterpieces of complete nonconformative art."

After his success with the Stockholm exhibition, some of the museums in Sweden began purchasing his work. He had many requests to exhibit his work throughout Europe and the United States. In 1911 fifty-seven of his figures were on display in Oskarshamn, and the groundwork was laid for a Döderhultarn Museum. His work was also featured in exhibitions in Copenhagen, Brighton, Rome and Turin during 1911. The next year some of his work was shipped to the United States and the Swedish Consulate sent it on tour in several major cities: New York City (1913) and San Francisco and Chicago (1915).

Legacy
Döderhultarn became known as one of Sweden's great artists. His work, as well as photos of his work, were circulated worldwide and he served as an inspiration to other woodcarvers, including Carl Johan Trygg (1887–1954)  and H. S. "Andy" Anderson (1892–1960). His popularity was so great that Döderhultarn figure became the generic term for any small figure in the minimalist style.

Notes

  Axel Petersson Döderhultarn was born Axel Petersson. After his success and many tour requests he was hailed as "the man from Döderhult (Döderhultarn)" Petersson took on the surname Döderhultarn
 Page 26,

References

Other sources
 
Refsal, Harley  (2015) Carving Flat-Plane Style Caricatures (Fox Chapel Publishing)  
Refsal, Harley (2015) Scandinavian Figure Carving (Fox Chapel Publishing)  
Refsal, Harley  (2004) Art & Technique of Scandinavian-Style Woodcarving (Fox Chapel Publishing)

External links
 Döderhultarn homepage

1868 births
1925 deaths
People from Oskarshamn Municipality
Swedish woodcarvers